Paul Hürlimann (21 November 1933 – 1 March 2012) was a Swiss equestrian. He competed in two events at the 1972 Summer Olympics.

References

External links
 

1933 births
2012 deaths
Swiss male equestrians
Olympic equestrians of Switzerland
Equestrians at the 1972 Summer Olympics
People from Wädenswil
Sportspeople from the canton of Zürich
20th-century Swiss people